Putut Waringin Jati (born 21 December 1986) is an Indonesian footballer who plays as a winger for PSIS Semarang.

References

External links
 Profile at Footballdatabase.eu

1986 births
Living people
Arema F.C. players
PSPS Pekanbaru players
Association football midfielders
Indonesian footballers
People from Sukoharjo Regency
Sportspeople from Central Java